"Last Breath" is the fourth track from Sevendust's 2010 eighth studio album Cold Day Memory. It was released as the album's third single on January 24, 2011 via 7 Bros. The band streamed "Last Breath" for the first time on the radio on March 17, 2010.

Charts

Release history

Personnel
Lajon Witherspoon - lead vocals
John Connolly - rhythm guitars, backing vocals
Clint Lowery - lead guitars, backing vocals
Vinnie Hornsby - bass guitar
Morgan Rose - drums, backing vocals

References

Sevendust songs
2011 singles
2010 songs
Songs written by Clint Lowery
Songs written by Morgan Rose
Song recordings produced by Johnny K